The following is a list of the television networks and announcers who have broadcast college football's Cotton Bowl Classic throughout the years.

Television

Notes
 During the 1980 game, CBS announcer Lindsey Nelson was stricken with laryngitis and had to leave the telecast after the first quarter. Sideline reporter Frank Glieber took over the play-by-play for the remainder of the game.

Spanish
In 2013, Fox Deportes provided the first Spanish U.S. telecast of the Cotton Bowl Classic. Fox Deportes returned for the game in 2014. In 2015, ESPN Deportes becomes the Spanish-language home of the Cotton Bowl Classic.

Radio

National Radio

In 2013 and 2014, the game will be broadcast by ESPN Radio and ESPN Deportes Radio. Brad Sham, who called the game for Westwood One in 1996, and from 1998 to 2012, will continue as play-by-play announcer for ESPN Radio. 2013 marks the first Spanish radio broadcast of the game.

Local radio

References

Cotton
Broadcasters
Cotton Bowl
Cotton Bowl
Cotton Bowl
Cotton Bowl
Cotton Bowl
Cotton Bowl
Cotton Bowl
Cotton Bowl